HSPA may refer to:

 High Speed Packet Access, a mobile broadband technology
 Hawaiian Sugar Planters' Association

Education
 High School Proficiency Assessment
 Humphrey School of Public Affairs, an American public policy school
 Hunter School of the Performing Arts, a school in Australia